Karatia Union is a union of Tangail Sadar Upazila, Bangladesh. It is a suburb of Tangail. It is the headquarters of the Karatia Zamindari family.

Demographics
According to the 2011 Bangladesh census, Karatia Union had 10,260 households and a population of 46,489. The literacy rate (age 7 and over) was 58.9% (male: 62.5%, female: 55.1%).

Education
Government Saadat College is located in this town. Every day almost 10,000 students come in Karatia to take lessons from different parts of Tangail and other nearby villages.

See also
 Elenga

References

Further reading
 

Populated places in Tangail District
Unions of Tangail Sadar Upazila
Tangail City